26th Regiment may refer to:

Infantry regiments
 26th (Cameronian) Regiment of Foot, a unit of the British Army
 26th Regiment of Bombay Infantry, a unit of the British Army
 26th Punjabis, a unit of the British Army
 26th Infantry Regiment (United States), a unit of the United States Army
 26th Marine Regiment (United States), a unit of the United States Marine Corps
 26th Indiana Infantry Regiment, a unit of the United States Army
 26th Regiment Infantry U.S. Colored Troops, a unit of the United States Army
 26th Arkansas Infantry Regiment, a unit of the United States Army
 26th Continental Regiment, a unit of the United States Army
 26th North Carolina Infantry, a unit of the United States Army
 26th Regiment Kentucky Volunteer Infantry, a unit of the United States Army
 26th Regiment Massachusetts Volunteer Infantry, a unit of the United States Army
 26th Michigan Volunteer Infantry Regiment, a unit of the United States Army
 26th Illinois Volunteer Infantry Regiment, a unit of the United States Army

Cavalry regiments
26th Cavalry Regiment (Philippine Scouts), a unit of the United States Army
26th Cavalry (United States, 1963–1988), a parent regiment of the United States Army National Guard

Armoured regiments
26th Tank Regiment, a unit of the Russian Army

Engineering regiments
 26 Engineer Regiment (United Kingdom), a unit of the British Army's Royal Engineers

Artillery regiments
 26th Field Artillery Regiment (Canada), a unit of the Canadian Army
 26th Regiment Royal Artillery, a unit of the British Army's Royal Artillery
 26th Field Artillery Regiment (United States), a unit of the United States Army